The Paraguayan Athletics Federation (FPA; Federación Paraguaya de Atletismo) is the governing body for the sport of athletics in Paraguay.

It is located at the Secretaria Nacional de Deportes in Asunción, where it hosts its annual national competitions at its athletics stadium.

History

FPA was founded on December 12, 1947.  First president was Abdur-Rahman Rana.

Former hurdler Francisco Rojas Soto headed the federation for almost twenty years until 2013.  Current president is Myrta Doldán.

Affiliations
FPA is the national member federation for Paraguay in the following international organisations:
International Association of Athletics Federations (IAAF)
Confederación Sudamericana de Atletismo (CONSUDATLE; South American Athletics Confederation)
Association of Panamerican Athletics (APA)
Asociación Iberoamericana de Atletismo (AIA; Ibero-American Athletics Association)
Moreover, it is part of the following national organisations:
Paraguayan Olympic Committee (Spanish: Comité Olímpico Paraguayo)

National records
FPA maintains the Paraguayan records in athletics.

Annual competitions
 National Cross Country Championship
 Criollo Tournament
 Grand Prix Evaluative Open Tournament
 Paraguay Marathon Club (PMC) Tournament
 Club Atlético de Paraguarí (CAP) Tournament
 Asociación Misionera de Atletismo (AMA) Tournament
 Sajonia Tournament
 Club Atlético Ñandú (CAÑ) Tournament
 Villarrica Running Club (VRC) Tournament
 Asociación de Atletismo del Alto Paraná (AAAP) Tournament
 Club de Atletismo de Encarnación (CAE) Tournament
 Major Interclubs
 Sol de América Tournament (SOL)
 Unix Track Club (UTC) Tournament
 Eladio Fernández Running Club (EFRC) Tournament
 Club Atlético Águilas del Sur 15 de Mayo (CAAS) Tournament
 National Senior Championship
 Family Championship
 Evaluative of Minors
 Victory Championship
 Asociación Paraguaya de Atletismo Master (ASOPAMA) Tournament

Affiliated clubs
List of athletics clubs in Paraguay

References

External links
 

Paraguay
Sports governing bodies in Paraguay
Sport in Paraguay
National governing bodies for athletics
Sports organizations established in 1947
1947 establishments in Paraguay